Antaeotricha bracatingae is a moth in the family Depressariidae. It was described by Paul Köhler in 1943. It is found in Rio Grande do Sul, Brazil.

References

Moths described in 1943
bracatingae
Moths of South America